Anastacia or Annastacia is a feminine given name.  Notable people with this name include:

People
Escrava Anastacia (born 1740), Brazilian folk saint
Anastacia Brice, American entrepreneur
 Anastacia Giron-Tupas, first Philippine female hospital superindendant; see List of firsts in the Philippines
 Annastacia Ndhlovu, Zimbabwean politician
Anastacia Lyn Newkirk (born 1968), American entertainer
Annastacia Palaszczuk (born 1969?), Australian politician and 39th Premier of Queensland
 Aastacia Pasahol, namesake of the Anastacia Pasahol Ancestral Home; see List of Cultural Properties of the Philippines in Sariaya, Quezon
Anastácia Sibo (born 1982), Angolan handball player

Characters
Aunt Anastacia, a fictional character from the 1954 U.S. film The Long, Long Trailer
Anastácia, a fictional character from the 1967 Brazilian telenovela Anastácia, a Mulher sem Destino
Anastacia, a fictional character from the 2014 U.S. film School Dance (film)

See also

Anastacio (name)
Anastazia Wambura
Annastacia Palaszczuk
Anastasia (given name)
Anastasiia
Anastasija
Anastasiya
Annastasia

Feminine given names